Transport in Denmark is developed and modern. The motorway network covers 1,111 km while the railway network totals 2,667 km of operational track. The Great Belt Fixed Link (opened in 1997) connecting the islands of Zealand and Funen and the New Little Belt Bridge (opened in 1970) connecting Funen and Jutland greatly improved the traffic flow across the country on both motorways and rail. The two largest airports of Copenhagen and Billund provide a variety of domestic and international connections, while ferries provide services to the Faroe Islands, Greenland, Iceland, Germany, Sweden, and Norway, as well as domestic routes servicing most Danish islands.

Air 
 
In 2011, a total of appr. 28 million passengers used Danish airports.

Copenhagen Airport is the largest airport in Scandinavia, handling approximately 29m passengers per year (2016).  It is located at Kastrup, 8 km south-east of central Copenhagen. It is connected by train to Copenhagen Central Station and beyond as well as to Malmö and other towns in Sweden.

For the west of the country, the major airport is Billund (3m passengers in 2016) although both Aalborg (1.4m passengers in 2011) and Aarhus (591.000 passengers in 2011) have smaller airports with regular connections to Copenhagen.

List of airports 

Denmark's main airports are:

 Copenhagen Airport (CPH), Scandinavia's busiest passenger airport located at Kastrup to the south-east of Copenhagen city and handling over 29 million passengers a year.
 Billund Airport (BLL), in central Jutland, one of Denmark's busiest cargo centres as well as a popular charter airline destination and an airport for regular flights serving 3 million passengers a year, mainly from the western part of the country.
 Aalborg Airport (AAL), located 5 km northwest of Aalborg, is Denmark's third busiest airport serving around 1,4 million passengers a year in connections with 25 European destinations and one of Europes busiest domestic lines to Copenhagen.
 Aarhus Airport (AAR), located 39 km northeast of Århus, serves some 540,000 passengers a year.

Other airports include: 
 Karup Airport (KRP) near Viborg in the west of Jutland, mainly serving Copenhagen with some 200,000 passengers a year.
 Bornholm Airport (RNN) 5 km from the centre of Rønne in the southwest of the island of Bornholm, with several regular flights to Copenhagen a day.
 Esbjerg Airport (EBJ), a small airport in the west of Jutland with regular flights to Aberdeen and Stavanger (although primarily serving North Sea Oilrigs).
 Sønderborg Airport (SGD), in the very south of Jutland with connections to Copenhagen.
 Roskilde Airport (RKE), 7 km southeast of Roskilde and some 38 km southwest of Copenhagen, serves mainly airtaxi and private business traffic.

Sea
Being an island state with a long coastline and always close to the sea, maritime transport has always been important in Denmark. From the primitive dugouts of the Stone Age to the complex designs of the Viking ships in the Viking Age, often built to exactly facilitate large scale cargo and passenger transportation. Denmark also engaged in the large scale cargo freights and slave transports of the European colonization endeavours in the Middle Ages and operated several smaller colonies of its own across the globe by the means of seafaring.

Today Denmark's ports handle some 48 million passengers and 109 million tonnes of cargo per year.

Passenger traffic
 
Passenger traffic is made up partly of ferry crossings within Denmark, partly of international ferry crossings and partly of cruise ship passengers. Some short ferry routes are being electrified and several more may be eligible, as in Norway.

Among the most important ports for passenger traffic (thousands of passengers per year in 2007) are:
 Helsingør 10,967
 Rødbyhavn 7,058
 Frederikshavn 2,894
 Sjællands Odde 2,233
 Esbjerg 1,827
 Gedser 1,612
 Aarhus 1,583
 Rønne 1,522
 Ebeltoft 962
 Copenhagen 872

In 2007, 288 cruise ships visited Copenhagen, rising to 376 in 2011 before returning to around 300 the following years. Around 800,000 cruise passengers and 200,000 crew visit Copenhagen each year.

Cargo traffic
Among the most important ports for cargo traffic (millions of tonnes per year in 2007) are:
 Fredericia 15,327
 Aarhus 12,189
 Copenhagen 7,379
 Helsingør 4,480
 Esbjerg 4,476
 Kalundborg 3,714
 Frederikshavn 3,200
 Aalborg Portland 2,999
 Aalborg 2,749
 Odense 2,616

Waterways
Waterways have historically and traditionally been crucial to local transportation in Denmark proper. Especially the Gudenå river-system in central Jutland, has played an important role. The waterways were navigated by wooden barges and later on steamboats. A few historical steamboats are still in operation, like the SS Hjejlen from 1861 at Silkeborg.

There is a 160 km natural canal through the shallow Limfjorden in northern Jutland, linking the North Sea to the Kattegat.

Many waterways has formerly been redirected and led through manmade canals in the 1900s, but mainly for agricultural purposes and not to facilitate transportation on any major scale. Several cities have manmade canals used for transportation and traffic purposes. Of special mention are the canals of Copenhagen and the Odense Canal, ferrying large numbers of both tourists and local citizens.

Merchant marine 

Denmark has a large merchant fleet relative to its size. In 2018, the fleet surpassed 20 million gt as the government sought to repatriate Danish-owned tonnage registered abroad, with measures including removal of the registration fee.

Denmark has created its own international register, called the Danish International Ship register (DIS), open to commercial vessels only. DIS ships do not have to meet Danish manning regulations.

Railways 

The largest railway operator in Denmark is Danske Statsbaner (DSB) — Danish State Railways. Arriva operates some routes in Jutland, and several other smaller operators provide local services.

The total length of operational track is 3,476 km standard gauge, with 1,756 km electrified.

The railway system is connected to Sweden by bridge in Copenhagen and ferry in Helsingør and Frederikshavn, by land to Germany in Padborg and ferry in Rødby and to Norway by ferry in Hirtshals.

Roads 

The road network in 2017 totalled 74,558 km of paved road. Motorways are toll-free except for the Great Belt Bridge joining Zealand and Funen and the Øresund Bridge linking Copenhagen to Malmö in Sweden.

Cycling 

Bicycling in Denmark is a common and popular utilitarian and recreational activity. Bicycling infrastructure is a dominant feature of both city and countryside infrastructure, with bicycle paths and bicycle ways in many places and an extensive network of bicycle routes, extending more than  nationwide. As a unique feature, Denmark has a VIN-system for bicycles which is mandatory by law. Often bicycling and bicycle culture in Denmark is compared to the Netherlands as a bicycle-nation.

Pipelines 
Figures in 2015:
 Crude oil 330 km
 Petroleum products 578 km (2007)
 Natural gas 1536 km

See also 
 Denmark
 Road traffic in Denmark
 Hydrogen link network
 Overseas constituencies
 Transport in the Faroe Islands
 Transport in Greenland

References

Further reading

External links
Public transportation Route Planner
Online Map, Address lookup
Copenhagen Airports
S-train and Danish train schedules
Copenhagenize - Copenhagen Bike Culture Blog
Metro information
All railway tracks
City of Copenhagen: City of Cyclists
Truck transport Denmark